Elías Yáñez was a Chilean equestrian. He competed in the individual jumping event at the 1912 Summer Olympics.

References

External links
 

Year of birth missing
Year of death missing
Chilean male equestrians
Olympic equestrians of Chile
Equestrians at the 1912 Summer Olympics
Place of birth missing